François Clement ([1714, Bèze, Côte-d'Or – 29 March 1793, Paris) was a French historian and member of the Benedictine Congregation of St. Maur.

Biography
His first studies were at the college of the Jesuits in Dijon. Soon after his profession in 1731 his superiors sent him to the monastery of the "Blancs-Manteaux" in Paris to assist in the scholarly work of the congregation.  He was a hard worker, who reportedly slept only two or three hours per night.

He first worked on the preparations for volumes XI and XII of the Histoire littéraire de la France; these volumes covered the years 1141-1167 and were edited by Charles Clémencet. He then edited, in collaboration with Dom Brial, a fellow Benedictine, volumes XII and XIII of the work begun by Bouquet in 1738, Recueil des historiens des Gaules et de la France (Paris, 1786), or as the title is generally given Scriptores rerum gallicarum et francicarum. These volumes contain altogether 439 original documents, accompanied by exhaustive introductions, numerous explanatory remarks, and critical notes.

Clément's chief work is a revised edition of the chronology first issued by Clémencet in one volume, entitled: L'art de vérifier les dates des faits historiques. The new edition in which the original work appeared in an entirely changed form was published in Paris in 1770. A third edition (Paris, 1783–1787) embraced three folio volumes; in this the original underwent even greater alterations, and the Clément spent more than ten years working on it. In contrast to Clémencet he treated his matter objectively, and was influenced neither by prejudices against the Jesuits nor by a strong support for the Jansenists. His position met with the approval of scholars and he was made a member of the "Académie des Inscriptions". The work has been called "the finest memorial of French learning of the eighteenth century". Clément was engaged in the preparation of a fourth and much enlarged edition when a stroke of apoplexy caused his death.

The unfinished work was completed by Nicolas Viton de Saint-Allais and appeared with additional matter in eighteen volumes (Paris, 1818–19). Viton de Saint-Allais also published from the literary remains of Clément the treatise L'art de vérifier les dates des faits historiques avant l'ère chrétienne (Paris, 1820). A work of less importance was one begun by Dom Poncet and edited by Clément, entitled Nouveaux éclaircissements sur l'origine et le Pentateuque des Samnaritains (Paris, 1760). The amount of material Clément collected is shown by the Catalogus manuscriptorum codicum Collegii Claramontani, quem excipit catalogus domus professæ Parisiensis, uterque digestus et notis ornatus (Paris, 1764). For information concerning his letters see the Revue bénédictine, XII, 508.

References

Attribution
 Cites as a source:
DE LAME, Bibliothèque des écrivains de la congrégation de Saint-Maur, 484.

1714 births
1793 deaths
18th-century French historians
Members of the Académie des Inscriptions et Belles-Lettres
French Benedictines
French male non-fiction writers
18th-century French male writers